Don Bosco College of Arts and Science, Karaikal, is a general degree college located in Karaikal, Puducherry. It was established in the year 1961. The college is affiliated with Pondicherry University. This college offers different courses in arts, commerce and science.

Departments

Science
Mathematics
Computer Science

Arts and Commerce
English
Business Administration
Commerce

Accreditation
The college is  recognized by the University Grants Commission (UGC).

References

External links

Universities and colleges in Puducherry
Educational institutions established in 2012
2012 establishments in Puducherry
Colleges affiliated to Pondicherry University